Wachtebeke is a municipality located in the Belgian province of East Flanders. The municipality comprises the town of Wachtebeke proper, and a smaller town: Overslag. In 2021, Wachtebeke had a total population of 7.769. The total area is 34.53 km2.

The current mayor of Wachtebeke (as of 2012) is Rudy van Cronenburg.

The Langelede is a small canal and corresponding residential street in the town. The neighborhood is slowly migrating from a poor agricultural environment towards a higher middle-class residential area.

In Wachtebeke lies the provincial park

People from Wachtebeke
 Bart De Pauw was born in Wachtebeke
 Jonas Geirnaert, animated film maker and comedian
 Lieven Scheire, comedian

Neighboring municipalities
1. Moerbeke
2. Eksaarde (Lokeren)
3. Zaffelare (Lochristi)
4. Mendonk (Gent)
5. Sint-Kruis-Winkel (Gent)
6. Zelzate

References

External links

Official website 

Municipalities of East Flanders
Populated places in East Flanders